Jangamaheswarapapuram is a village in Gurajala mandal of Guntur district of Andhra Pradesh in South India. It is 2 km south of Gurajala.

Villages in Guntur district